Karen Klinzing (born September 28, 1970) is an American educator and politician.

Klinzing lived in Woodbury, Minnesota. She received her bachelor's degree from University of Wisconsin–Madison and her master's degree from Hamline University. Klinzing taught history, civics, and economics at Bloomington High School in Bloomington, Minnesota. Klinzing served in the Minnesota House of Representatives from 2003 to 2006 and was a Republican.

Notes

1970 births
Living people
People from Woodbury, Minnesota
Hamline University alumni
University of Wisconsin–Madison alumni
Educators from Minnesota
American women educators
Women state legislators in Minnesota
Republican Party members of the Minnesota House of Representatives
21st-century American women